Old Dominion most commonly refers to:

The Old Dominion, a nickname for the U.S. Commonwealth of Virginia
Colony of Virginia
Old Dominion University, a public university in Norfolk, Virginia
Old Dominion Monarchs, the athletic teams representing Old Dominion University
Old Dominion, Virginia, an unincorporated community in Albemarle County, Virginia

Old Dominion may also refer to:

Music
Old Dominion (band), an American country-rock band
Old Dominion (album)
Old Dominion, an album by Hotel of the Laughing Tree
"Old Dominion", a 2000 song by Avail from One Wrench
"Old Dominion", a 2002 song by Enon from High Society

Other uses
Old Dominion (train), a former Amtrak passenger train in the United States
Old Dominion Athletic Conference, an NCAA Division III athletic conference
Old Dominion Brewing Company
Old Dominion Electric Cooperative
Old Dominion Foundation, a predecessor of the Andrew W. Mellon Foundation
Old Dominion Freight Line
Old Dominion (magazine), a magazine from 1870 to 1873